István Adorján (12 November 1913 – 7 June 1987) was a Hungarian cyclist. He competed in the individual and team road race events at the 1936 Summer Olympics.

References

External links
 

1913 births
1987 deaths
Hungarian male cyclists
Olympic cyclists of Hungary
Cyclists at the 1936 Summer Olympics